Mary Josephine Beverley (née Dunn; 22 September 1947 – 23 May 2016) was a prolific English-Canadian writer of historical and contemporary romance novels from 1988 to 2016.
 
Her works are regarded as well researched, filled with historical details, and peopled by communities of interlinked characters, stretching the boundaries of the historical romantic fiction genre. They have been translated into several languages, and she has received multiple awards.

Biography

Early life and education
Mary Josephine Dunn was born 22 September 1947 in Lancashire, England. She was of Irish descent.

At age 11, she went to an all-girls boarding school, Layton Hill Convent, Blackpool. At 16, she wrote her first romance, with a medieval setting, completed in instalments in an exercise book. She read history and American studies at Keele University in Staffordshire from 1966 to 1970, where she earned a degree in English history. The broad-based learning of Keele's foundation year and the availability of archived Regency-period newspapers were useful resources to enable her to develop her fiction writing.

On 24 June 1971, she married Ken Beverley, whom she met at Keele.

Career
After graduation, she quickly attained a position as a youth employment officer. She stayed in this profession until 1976, working first in Newcastle-under-Lyme, Staffordshire, and then in West Bridgford, Nottinghamshire.

In 1976, Beverley moved to Canada, where her scientist husband was invited to do post-doctoral research at Dalhousie University in Halifax, Nova Scotia. When her professional qualifications proved unusable in the Canadian labour market, Beverley decided to develop her early interest in creative writing.

Many of her "Rogue" characters were created in an initial manuscript entitled A Regency Rape. At this point, Beverley did not have a fixed idea of the narrower literary boundaries drawn by the traditional Regency romantic novel and thus created a literary hybrid. A precursor of the Regency historical novel, the work had a more varied cast of characters which, while respectful of the world of Georgette Heyer, broadened the scope and intensity of the genre. At this time Beverley was still unpublished, but devoted her time to caring for her two young sons and participating in the woman-centred childbirth movement, which made her especially careful to portray births in her novels realistically but positively.

The turning point in Beverley's writing career came when her move to Montreal led to her attendance at a talk on "The state of romance in fiction" by Janet Adams, at Beaconsfield Library on 23 May 1984. The executive advisor of the Writers' Association for Romance and Mainstream demystified the creative process for the budding author and was sufficiently impressed by Beverley's writing to act as her agent.

That same year, the family moved to Ottawa, Ontario, Canada, where Beverley became a founding member of the Ottawa Romance Writers' Association (ORWA). Formed in 1985, ORWA became her "nurturing community" for the next 12 years.

In 1988, Beverley, who was actively writing science fiction as well as romance, was a finalist in the L. Ron Hubbard Writers of the Future Contest. That same year, she sold her first romance novel. With her ensuing success in the latter genre, she allowed speculative writing to slide, though elements of it appear periodically in some of her romances and novellas.

Beverly wrote at multiple blogs:
 Jo Talk, a solo blog where "she post[ed] anything that interest[ed] her"
 Minepast, a solo blog where "she share[d] interesting tid-bits of history she discover[ed] as she researche[d] her novels"
 the UK Historical Romance blog
 Word Wenches, a group blog comprising posts by eight women "historical authors who blog about history, writing, and anything vaguely related"

Personal life
Soon after university, Beverley and her husband Ken moved to Ottawa, Ontario, Canada. Beverley became a Canadian with dual citizenship, and she and Ken raised their two sons there, then moved to Victoria, British Columbia.

More recently, she and Ken moved back to England, and they lived in Dawlish, Devon, though they were considering returning to Victoria permanently.

Later life and death
In 2012, Beverley survived a bout with cancer and was in remission for four years. However, the cancer returned and moved very quickly; she succumbed to it on 23 May 2016. She died in a care home in Yorkshire, England.

Recognition

Her works have been translated into many languages and have won her many awards, including five RITAs, two Career Achievement Awards from Romantic Times, The Golden Leaf Award, and the Readers' Choice Award. A member of the Romance Writers of America (RWA) Honor Roll, Beverley is the sole Canadian romance author inducted into the RWA Hall of Fame.

Bibliography

Traditional Regencies
 Lord Wraybourne's Betrothed (1990)
 The Stanfourth Secrets (1989)
 The Stolen Bride (1990)
 Emily and the Dark Angel (1992)
 If Fancy Be the Food of Love (1991) (see Novellas below)
 The Fortune Hunter (1992)
 Deirdre and Don Juan (1993)

Company of Rogues Series
 An Arranged Marriage (1991) Nicholas and Eleanor
 An Unwilling Bride (1992) Lucien and Beth
 Christmas Angel (1992) Leander and Judith
 Forbidden (1994) Francis and Serena
 Dangerous Joy (1995) Miles and Felicity
 Dragon's Bride (2001) Con and Susan (A Three Georges Story)
 The Devil's Heiress (2001) Hawk and Clarissa (A Three Georges Story)
 The Demon's Mistress (2001) Van and Maria (A Three Georges Story) 
 Hazard (2002) Race and Anne
 St. Raven (2003) Tris and Cressida
 Skylark (2004)  Stephen and Laura
 The Rogue's Return (2006) Simon and Jancy
 To Rescue a Rogue (2006) Dare and Mara
 Lady Beware (2007) Darien and Thea
 A Shocking Delight (2014) David and Lucy
 The Viscount Needs a Wife (2016) Dauntry and Kitty
 Merely a Marriage (2017) Norris and Ariana

Medieval Romances
 Lord of My Heart  (1992)
 Dark Champion  (1993)
 The Shattered Rose  (1996)
 Lord of Midnight  (1998)
 Day of Wrath (see Novellas below)
 The Wise Virgin (see Novellas below)

The Malloren Series
 My Lady Notorious (1993) Chastity and Cyn
 Tempting Fortune (1995) Portia and Bryght
 Something Wicked (1997) Elf and Fort
 Secrets of the Night (1999) Rosamunde and Brand
 Devilish  (2000) Diana and Rothgar
 Winter Fire  (2003) Genova and Ashart
 A Most Unsuitable Man (2005)
 A Lady's Secret (2008) Petra and Robin
 The Secret Wedding (2009)
 The Secret Duke (2010) Bella and Thorn
 An Unlikely Countess (2011)
 A Scandalous Countess (2012)

The Georges Series
(related to the Company of Rogues)
 Demon's Mistress (2001)
 Dragon's Bride (2001)
 Devil's Heiress (2001)

Novellas and short stories
 
 

 
 
 
 
 
 
 
  Reissue 2006.
 
 
 
  MM 2006

Single Novels
 Forbidden Magic (1995)

References

External links
 
 Jo Beverley's Official Website at jobev.com

Further reading
 

1947 births
2016 deaths
People from Blackpool
Alumni of Keele University
RITA Award winners
British emigrants to Canada
English women novelists
Canadian women novelists
English romantic fiction writers
Canadian romantic fiction writers
20th-century Canadian novelists
Women romantic fiction writers
20th-century Canadian women writers
20th-century English women
20th-century English people
Writers of historical romances